Isnag (also called Isneg) is a language spoken by around 40,000 Isnag people of Apayao Province in the Cordillera Administrative Region in the northern Philippines. Around 85% of Isnag are capable of reading the Isnag language. Many Isnag speakers also speak Ilocano.

Dialects
Ethnologue lists the following dialects of Isnag.
Bayag
Dibagat-Kabugao
Calanasan
Karagawan (Daragawan)
Talifugu-Ripang (Tawini)

Alternate names for Isnag include Apayao, Dibagat-Kabugao-Isneg, Isneg, and Maragat (Ethnologue).

Isnag is spoken in the northern two thirds of Apayao Province, Cagayan Province (Claveria and Santa Praxedes municipalities), Abra, and Ilocos Norte Province, and scattered areas along the Apayao western border (Ethnologue).

The closely related Adasen (Addasen, Addasen Tinguian, Itneg Adasen) language, which consists of western and eastern dialects, is spoken in northeastern Abra and into western Apayao Province. There are 4,000 speakers (Ethnologue).

Sounds

Isnag is also one of the Philippine languages which is excluded from - allophone.

Language sample
Isnag: 
Approximate English translation: Friends, let us love each other, because love comes from God. – 1 John 4:7
Isnag: 
Approximate English Translation: Praise God, the God and Father of the Lord Jesus Christ. – 1 Peter 1:3

Historical sound changes

References

External links
 Listen to a sample of Adasen from Global Recordings Network

Cagayan Valley languages
Languages of Apayao
Languages of Abra (province)